Erfan al-Hiyali was the Defence minister of Iraq, serving in the Cabinet of Haider al-Abadi. The Iraqi parliament voted on al-Hiyali as defense minister on 30 January 2017. He was succeeded by Najah al-Shammari on 24 June 2019. He was also formerly the Commander of Iraqi Central Command.

References

People from Al Anbar Governorate
Iraqi Sunni Muslims
Defence ministers of Iraq
Living people
1956 births